The southern celestial hemisphere, also called the Southern Sky, is the southern half of the celestial sphere; that is, it lies south of the celestial equator. This arbitrary sphere, on which seemingly fixed stars form constellations, appears to rotate westward around a polar axis due to Earth's rotation.

At any given time, the entire Southern Sky is visible from the geographic South Pole, while less of this hemisphere is visible the further north the observer is located. The northern counterpart is the northern celestial hemisphere.

Astronomy 

In the context of astronomical discussions or writing about celestial mapping, it may also simply then be referred to as the Southern Hemisphere.

For the purpose of celestial mapping, the sky is considered by astronomers as the inside of a sphere divided in two halves by the celestial equator. The Southern Sky or Southern Hemisphere is, therefore, that half of the celestial sphere that is south of the celestial equator. Even if this one is the ideal projection of the terrestrial equatorial onto the imaginary celestial sphere, the Northern and Southern celestial hemispheres must not be confused with descriptions of the terrestrial hemispheres of Earth itself.

Observation 

From the South Pole, in good visibility conditions, the Southern Sky features over 2,000 fixed stars that are easily visible to the naked eye, while about 20,000 to 40,000 with the aided eye. In large cities, about 300 to 500 stars can be seen depending on the extent of light and air pollution. The farther north, the fewer are visible to the observer.

The brightest stars are all larger than the Sun. Sirius in the constellation of Canis Major has the brightest apparent magnitude of −1.46; it has a radius twice that of the Sun and is 8.6 light-years away. Canopus and the next fixed star α Centauri, 4.2 light-years away, are also located in the Southern Sky, having declinations around −60°; too close to the south celestial pole for either to be visible from Central Europe.

History
The Southern Sky was first substantially charted by English astronomer Edmond Halley, and published by him in 1679.

See also
 Astronomical coordinate systems
 Celestial spheres

References 

Astronomical coordinate systems
Hemispheres